Madignano is a comune (municipality) in the Province of Cremona in the Italian region Lombardy, located about  southeast of Milan and about  northwest of Cremona.

The municipality of Madignano contains the frazione (subdivision) Ripalta Vecchia.

Madignano borders the following municipalities: Castelleone, Crema, Izano, Ripalta Arpina, Ripalta Cremasca.

Transportation 
Madignano has a railway station on the Treviglio–Cremona line.

Demographic evolution

References

External links
 www.comune.madignano.cr.it

Cities and towns in Lombardy